O'Neills Irish International Sports Company Ltd. is an Irish sporting goods manufacturer established in 1918. It is the largest manufacturer of sportswear in Ireland, with production plants located in Dublin and Strabane.

O'Neills has a long relationship with Irish rugby and association football and sports of Gaelic Athletic Association. The company currently supplies kits to 29 of the 32 inter-county teams in both Gaelic football and hurling; only Waterford GAA, Leitrim GAA and Armagh GAA do not use O'Neills kits.

The O'Neills brand has been producing uniform kits, footballs and sliotars (hurling and shinty balls) for Gaelic games but is fast becoming a major supplier to rugby and association football clubs across Ireland, Britain, Europe and North America. O'Neills was the exclusive supplier to the Irish Provinces for many years and to the Irish international teams during their Triple Crown era.

History 

O'Neills Irish International Sports Company Ltd. was founded in 1918 by Charles O'Neill, when it primarily focused on the production of footballs and hurling balls from their factory at Capel Street, Dublin. By 1960, the brand had grown in size considerably and its popularity had grown, leading to its expansion into manufacturing playing kits for the GAA market. By 1974, the company had expanded their operations, and opened their first base in Northern Ireland at Strabane, followed by a company move from Capel Street to Walkinstown Avenue by 1984.

The Strabane plant employs around 500 staff, and is the main production facility for Gaelic football, rugby union, field hockey, and basketball apparel.

In 2010, the company launched their official online store with a further expansion of the online shopping element of the business taking place in 2013.

By 2022, O'Neills employs around 900 staff in key locations such as the Republic of Ireland, Northern Ireland (United Kingdom), Australia and the United States.

Sponsorships 
The following teams and associations use products manufactured by O'Neills:

Association football

National teams
 DR Congo

Club teams

 Burgess Hill Town F.C.
 Deal Town F.C.
 Bristol City F.C. (since before ending the 2022-2023 season and since before starting the 2023-2024 season)
 Sutton United
 Horsham F.C.
 Margate F.C.
 North Ferriby F.C.
 Wycombe Wanderers F.C.
 Bohemian F.C.
 Derry City F.C.
 Galway United F.C.
 UCD AFC
 Treaty United F.C.
 Partick Thistle F.C.

Australian rules football
  Adelaide Football Club
  AFL Europe

Cricket

National teams
 Ireland cricket team

Club teams
 Glastonbury Cricket Club
 Terenure Cricket Club
 Strabane Cricket Club

Esports
 AthletixEsport
 Karmine Corp
 MDS Factory
 Northway
 Oslowesport
 PuR eSport

Field hockey
 Sheffield Hockey Club
 Worthing Hockey Club
 Hockey One

Governing bodies
 Canadian GAA
 Toronto GAA
 Auckland GAA
 Paralympics Ireland
Australasia GAA

Gaelic football and Hurling 

 (St Enda's GAC, Glengormley.) (Antrim GAA)
 RGU GAA (Thomas Russell Gaelic Union Dún Pádraig)
 Madison GAA (Wisconsin)
 (Blessington GAA.) (Wicklow GAA)
 Meath GAA
 Mayo GAA
 Galway GAA
 Dublin GAA
 Kerry GAA
 Kildare GAA 
 Cork GAA
 New York GAA
 Limerick GAA
 Louth GAA
 Monaghan GAA
 London GAA
 Westmeath GAA
 Derry GAA
 Tyrone GAA
 Tipperary GAA
 Kilkenny GAA
 Clare GAA
 Cincinnati GAA
 Roslea Shamrocks (Fermanagh)
 Knocknagoshill GAA (Kerry)
 Kerne FG
 GF Bro Sant-Brieg
 Lorient GAC
 Paris Gaels GAA
 Clermont Gaels
 Tolosa Gaels
  Bordeaux GFC
 Lugdunum CLG Lyon
 Guernsey Gaels
 GSC Luxembourg
 Éire Óg Sevilla
 Barcelona Gaels
 Padova Gaelic Football
 Ascaro Rovigo GFC
 Munich Colmcilles
 Amsterdam GAC
 Slovak Shamrocks
 Prague Hibernians GFC
 Stockholm Gaels
 Oulu Irish Elks
 Helsinki Harps
 South Africa Gaels
 Tír Chonaill Gaels
 Chicago Wolfe Tones
 Chicago Patriots
 St. Louis Gaelic Athletic Club
 San Antonio GAC
 Montreal Shamrocks GAC
 Arabian Celts
 Abu Dhabi Na Fianna
 Dubai Celts
 Singapore Gaelic Lions
 Orang Éire
 Young Ireland Sydney
 Zürich Inneoin GAA
 Hurling Club of Madison 
 Montreal Shamrocks GAC
 St. Louis Gaelic Athletic Club
 Stuttgart GAA
 Zürich Inneoin GAA

International rules

National teams
 Ireland international rules football team

Rugby union

National teams
 Cornwall

Club teams

 Brumbies
 Western Force
 Worcester Warriors
 Cork Constitution
 Swords RFC
 Hawke's Bay Magpies
 Manawatu Turbos

Rugby league

National teams
 Ireland

Club teams

 Bolton Mets
 AS Carcassonne
 Keighley Cougars
 Penrith Panthers 
 St Helens RLFC
 Warrington Wolves

References

External links
 

Manufacturing companies of Ireland
Sportswear brands
1918 establishments in Ireland
Clothing companies established in 1918
Sporting goods manufacturers of Ireland